Evansville Lutheran School is a private, Lutheran parochial elementary school located in Evansville, Indiana, in the United States. Established in 1971, Evansville Lutheran School is the first parochial Lutheran school. The school is affiliated with the Lutheran Church–Missouri Synod.

Overview 
The school is based on the ideas and concepts of Martin Luther. Originally the school was divided into two sections: the Early Childhood Campus "ECC", holding K-4 and the Middle Upper Grade Campus "MUG", holding 5–8.

Today the school holds all 189 students in their original "ECC" campus, located on Virginia St. The school was created by three LCMS churches including, St. Paul's Lutheran Church (LCMS), Lutheran Church of Our Redeemer, and Trinity Lutheran Church. The school is in basketball LIT tournaments and is known for its  excellent music program. The school teaches students to honor God in the terms of Martin Luther.

As for sports, the school offers basketball, cheerleading, cross country, track, and volleyball. The school has also developed a program for younger children who are interested in learning basketball, called the Lutheran Developmental League, teaching children in grades K-4 the sport of basketball.

The school colors are purple and gold, which represents royalty and their mascot is a ruling monarch.

Notable alumni

Andy Benes1977 Professional baseball player for the major leagues
Alan Benes1975 Professional baseball player for the major leagues

References

External links
 LCMS.org
 Official Website
 Redeemer Church

Schools in Evansville, Indiana
Private high schools in Indiana
Private middle schools in Indiana
Lutheran schools in Indiana
Educational institutions established in 1971